The Acharya Jagadish Chandra Bose Indian Botanic Garden, previously known as Indian Botanic Garden and the Calcutta Botanic Garden, is situated in Shibpur, Howrah near Kolkata. They are commonly known as the Calcutta Botanical Garden and previously as the Royal Botanic Garden, Calcutta. The gardens exhibit a wide variety of rare plants and a total collection of over 12,000 specimens spread over 109 hectares. It is under Botanical Survey of India (BSI) of Ministry of Environment and Forests, Government of India.

History
The gardens were founded in 1787 by Colonel Robert Kyd, an army officer of the East India Company, primarily for the purpose of identifying new plants of commercial value, such as teak, and growing spices for trade. In a written proposal to Governor-General John Macpherson to establish the garden, Kyd stated it was "not for the purpose of collecting rare plants as things of mere curiosity, but for establishing a stock for disseminating such articles as may prove beneficial to the inhabitants as well to the natives of Great Britain, and which ultimately may tend to the extension of the national commerce and riches."  India was undergoing mass famine in the 18th century as a result of political turmoil, in addition to severe socio-economic crises. Robert Kyd's Garden proposal was motivated by the desire to increase agricultural revenue in an effort to end food scarcity and promote economic growth. Furthermore, Robert Kyd was accustomed to growing various plants (spices) from the East Indies, which were obtained from East India Company's voyages. The East India Company's Court of Directors supported Kyd's ambitions to establish cinnamon, tobacco, dates, Chinese tea, and coffee in the Garden due to its economic benefits. Tea, for example, was a highly commodified plant that was indispensable to the European economy. The indigenous tea plants of India were not able to be produced in mass quantities, leading to the kidnapping of Chinese gardeners and their tea plants. Chinese tea was first transplanted to the Calcutta Garden and larger tea plantations in Ooty and Nilgiris were established by forcing the people of Assam and Ooty to relocate. Additionally, Cacti such as Nopal were imported from Mexico and established in the Garden to produce textile dyes, an industry which Spain dominated.

Joseph Dalton Hooker says of this Botanical Garden that "Amongst its greatest triumphs may be considered the introduction of the tea-plant from China ... the establishment of the tea-trade in the Himalaya and Assam is almost entirely the work of the superintendents of the gardens of Calcutta and Seharunpore (Saharanpur)."

A major change in policy, however, was introduced by the botanist William Roxburgh after he became superintendent of the garden in 1793. Roxburgh brought in plants from all over India and developed an extensive herbarium. This collection of dried plant specimens eventually became the Central National Herbarium of the Botanical Survey of India, which comprises 2,500,000 items.  During the early years of the garden Joseph Dalton Hooker writes:

Botany and Power 
The Calcutta Gardens, along with gardens such as Singapore Botanic Gardens, Botanic Gardens St. Vincent and others located in Southeast Asia formed a large network of scientific institutions through which plants were transferred, classified according to the Linnaean system, and used to justify colonial expansion.

Along with the policy change enacted by William Roxburgh, the East India Company was itself undergoing political and historical changes. Pitt's India Act formally brought the Company under British rule, although the Company had governing power and ruled alongside the Nawabs of Bengal from 1786-1787. The development of botanical science in India happened alongside the expansion of the East India Company as it acquired control of the agricultural economy. The Company conducted extensive scientific research in India as it was gaining power and territory in South Asia. A large amount of botanical surveys were collected that provided information on the estimated revenue that could be made from economically valued plants. In addition, the surveys were used as a means to establish credibility that the British government would benefit from the Company's involvement with governing affairs. Although it was a trading company, it had the power to collect revenue as an ordinary government could. Specifically, the revenue collection system was purposely structured in a way that prevented officials and agricultural cultivators from interacting. The collection procedures, which involved local Indian officials as well as British officials, were set in place by the Court of Directors and ensured to be as objective as possible. An increasing number of botanists and scientists were gaining access to new areas in India, leading to an era of acquiring as much scientific data as possible. Other key figures in developing the Calcutta Garden were Nathaniel Wallich, who was superintendent of the Calcutta Garden after William Roxburgh, and William Griffith, who had a well-known reputation at the time.

Over the years attractive display gardens for the public have been developed and many kinds of plants have been cultivated for scientific observation. During the 1970s the garden initiated a program to introduce improved food plants and other varieties of economic benefit to the people of India.

The garden was designated the Acharya Jagadish Chandra Bose Indian Botanic Garden on June 25, 2009, in honor of Jagadish Chandra Bose, the Bengali polymath, and natural scientist.

This garden is a No Plastic Zone.

Calcutta Botanic Garden Layout 
Griffith was instrumental in rearranging the Calcutta Garden in a way that reflected scientific practice at the time, emphasizing the importance of scientific classification in the Garden's appearance. Griffith often criticized the layout of the Botanic Garden under Wallich's control as he believed it did not have the qualities of a traditional European garden. These qualities included "uniformity of design, adaptation of particular parts to particular purposes, including those of science and instruction."  The ways in which the Garden was restructured from 1816 to 1846 reflected the demands of a rapidly growing scientific field that fueled European colonial influence. Key features of the 1816 map depict four nurseries, housing for laborers, a farm, and a small Linnaean Garden. The map titled "Plan of the Botanical Gardens December 1845" was developed in 1843 by Griffith and shows key differences compared to the 1816 plan created by Wallich. Major illustrations of natural features such as rivers and trees, which appeared alongside the nurseries, are either not included in the map or depicted using symbols. A large teak plantation replaces the native housing and the landscape is clearly divided into large divisions, indicating that science was used to categorize the natural landscape. An emphasis was placed on labelling plants and categorizing the different areas of the Garden which, according to Griffith, allowed it to be "gardens of science and instruction."

Attractions
The best-known landmark of the garden is The Great Banyan, an enormous banyan tree (Ficus benghalensis) that is reckoned to be the largest tree in the world, at more than 330 metres in circumference.  It partially inspired the novel Hothouse by Brian Aldiss.  The gardens are also famous for their enormous collections of orchids, bamboos, palms, and plants of the screw pine genus (Pandanus).

Animals seen inside the Botanic Garden include the Jackal (Canis aureus), Indian mongoose and the Indian Fox (Vulpes bengalensis). Many species of snake are also to be found in the garden.

Gallery

References

225 years of Botanic History by Shakunt Pandey (PDF, 2.0 MB)

External links

Royal Botanic Garden, Calcutta Index, ca. 1830
Botanical Survey of India
ENVIS Centre on Floral Diversity

Buildings and structures in Howrah
Botanical gardens in India
Tourist attractions in Howrah district
1787 establishments in British India
Tourism in West Bengal